Manuel Soares Marques (8 August 1917 in Lisbon – ?), former Portuguese footballer who played as midfielder.

Football career 

Marques gained 2 caps for Portugal and made his debut 13 March 1945 in Lisbon against Spain, in a 2–2 draw.

External links 
 
 

1917 births
Footballers from Lisbon
Portuguese footballers
Association football midfielders
Primeira Liga players
Sporting CP footballers
Portugal international footballers
Year of death missing